Henri Van den Bulcke (1889–1947) was a Belgian ice hockey player and administrator. He won a European title in 1913 and finished third in 1911. In 1912 he founded the Royal Belgian Ice Hockey Federation and acted as its first president until 1920. During the same period he served as president of the International Ice Hockey Federation.

References 

1889 births
1947 deaths
Belgian ice hockey defencemen
Belgian sports executives and administrators
International Ice Hockey Federation executives
People from Ixelles
Sportspeople from Brussels